José Leonardo Cruz (born 17 December 1975) is a Colombian boxer. He competed in the men's lightweight event at the 2000 Summer Olympics he also has been seen as one of the best boxers of his hometowns generation.

References

1975 births
Living people
Colombian male boxers
Olympic boxers of Colombia
Boxers at the 2000 Summer Olympics
Sportspeople from Barranquilla
Lightweight boxers